Vitia may refer to:
Vitina, a town and municipality in Kosovo
Njomza Vitia (born 1994), Albanian-American singer known mononymously as Njomza